Leopold Tajner (May 15, 1921 – February 25, 1993) was a Polish cross-country skier and ski jumper who competed in the 1940s and 1950s.

He was born in Roztropice and died in Wisła.

At the 1948 Winter Olympics he finished 76th in the 18 km cross-country skiing event.

He finished 39th in the individual large hill at the 1952 Winter Olympics in Oslo.

References

External links
 Olympic ski jumping results: 1948-60

1921 births
1993 deaths
Polish male cross-country skiers
Polish male ski jumpers
Polish male Nordic combined skiers
Olympic cross-country skiers of Poland
Olympic ski jumpers of Poland
Olympic Nordic combined skiers of Poland
Cross-country skiers at the 1948 Winter Olympics
Nordic combined skiers at the 1948 Winter Olympics
Ski jumpers at the 1952 Winter Olympics
People from Cieszyn Silesia
People from Bielsko County
Sportspeople from Silesian Voivodeship